Tarzan and the She-Devil is a 1953 American film directed by Kurt Neumann and starring Lex Barker as Tarzan and Joyce MacKenzie as Jane. It also features Raymond Burr, Tom Conway and Monique van Vooren, who plays the "She-Devil."

Tarzan is held captive during much of the film, and critics derided it as lacking action. This was Barker's fifth and final appearance as Edgar Rice Burroughs' ape-man.  Barker, who had replaced Johnny Weissmuller in the role of Tarzan, would be succeeded by Gordon Scott.

Plot
Beautiful but deadly Lyra the She-Devil and her ivory-hunting friends have discovered a large herd of bull elephants and plot to capture them, forcing an East African native tribe to serve as bearers. Their ivory poaching plans meet opposition when Tarzan gives his deafening jungle cry. The tusked creatures come running, stomping all over Lyra's plans.

Cast
Lex Barker as Tarzan
Joyce MacKenzie as Jane Porter
Raymond Burr as Vargo
Monique van Vooren as Lyra, the She-Devil
Tom Conway as Fidel
Michael Granger as Philippe Lavarre (as Michael Grainger)
Henry Brandon as M'Tara, Lycopo Chief

Production
Hal Erickson writes in Allmovie that many scenes in the film "were lifted from the 1934 Frank Buck documentary Wild Cargo.

Critical reception
The Radio Times said  "despite the exotic title and a great villain in Raymond Burr, this is a standard tale of ivory-seeking elephant hunters being stymied by the king of the jungle." The Pittsburgh Post-Gazette said "the plot has something to do with illegal elephant hunting" and that "Cheta, the performing chimp, steals what there is of the show."

References

External links

 ERBzine Silver Screen: Tarzan and the She-Devil

1953 films
1950s fantasy films
American fantasy films
American sequel films
Films directed by Kurt Neumann
Tarzan films
Films produced by Sol Lesser
Films scored by Paul Sawtell
American black-and-white films
1950s English-language films
1950s American films